Basketball at the 2003 Southeast Asian Games was held from 7 to 13 December 2003 in Army Sports Gymnasium, Ho Chi Minh City, Vietnam. This edition featured both tournaments for men's and women's team.

The Philippines team swept all of their assignments en route to their 13th overall men's title and seventh consecutive since the 1991 Games, while Malaysia, although they lost their final game against Thailand on the final day of the tournament, still managed to annex their third straight women's title since the 1997 edition, and their 10th title overall.

This edition features six countries and both the men's and women's division were well represented at the Games.

Men's tournament

Participating nations

Results

Women's tournament

Participating nations

Results

References

2003
Basketball
2003–04 in Asian basketball
International basketball competitions hosted by Vietnam